Xylecata xanthura is a moth of the  subfamily Arctiinae. It is found in Cameroon, the Democratic Republic of Congo, Gabon, Ghana, Malawi, Nigeria, Sierra Leone and Togo.

References

Nyctemerina
Moths described in 1880